John Oglander , DD (29 October 1737 – 13 January 1794) was Warden of New College, Oxford, from 1792 until his death.

Oglander was born in Nunwell. He matriculated at St John's College, Oxford in 1756. He then migrated to New College where he graduated BA in 1761, MA in 1765 and BD in 1770.

References

1737 births
1794 deaths
Wardens of New College, Oxford
People from the Isle of Wight